Taylor C. Wallace is an American food and nutrition scientist and media personality. Wallace is the principal consultant at the Think Healthy Group and an adjunct professor in the Department of Nutrition and Food studies at George Mason University. He operates a blog, is a regular contributor to the Dr. Oz Show, has previously served in senior staff positions at The National Osteoporosis Foundation, and Council for Responsible Nutrition.

Career
Wallace received his PhD and MS in Food Science and Nutrition from Ohio State University and a BS in Food Science and Technology from the University of Kentucky.

In 2011, Wallace was appointed senior director of scientific and regulatory affairs at the Council for Responsible Nutrition, succeeding Andrew Shao. Prior to this, he had served as scientific communications program manager at the International Life Sciences Institute, North America.

In 2013, the National Osteoporosis Foundation (NOF) hired Wallace as senior director of science, policy, and government affairs. In the same year, he also served as senior director of scientific and clinical programs at the National Bone Health Alliance, a public-private partnership operated by the NOF.

In 2015, the American College of Nutrition awarded Wallace with the Charles E. Ragus Award for his research and innovation in the field of nutrition science.

In 2016, Wallace founded Think Healthy Group, a food science and nutrition firm.

In 2017, Wallace was appointed Senior Fellow at the Center for Magnesium Research and Education.

Wallace is currently an adjunct professor at the Department of Nutrition and Food Studies at George Mason University and also Chief Food and Nutrition Scientist for the Produce for Better Health Foundation.

Wallace is a former Trustee and Treasurer of Feeding Tomorrow, the Foundation of the Institute of Food Technologists. He is a fellow of the American College of Nutrition, the Deputy Editor-in-Chief for the Journal of the American College of Nutrition. His other editorial board work includes serving as Editor-in-Chief of the Journal of Dietary Supplements and as Nutrition Section Editor of the Annals of Medicine.

Wallace is a member of the American College of Nutrition, American Society for Nutrition, American Society for Bone and Mineral Research, Institute of Food Technologists, and Phi Tau Sigma Honor Society for Food and Science and Technology.

Wallace has appeared as a food science and nutrition expert commentator on mainstream television programs such as The Dr. Oz Show and NBC4 Washington. Wallace has written for USA Today.

Books and publications 
Wallace is the author of over 80 publications and editor of 6 academic textbooks in the fields of food science and nutrition. His publications and textbooks have been cited thousands of times according to Google Scholar.

Text books 

 </ref>

Cookbooks 

 Wallace, T.C. Sizzling Science. Morrisville, NC: Lulu Press. 2019.

Selected journal article 

 
 
 
 
 

 Wallace, Taylor C. (2011-01-01). "Anthocyanins in Cardiovascular Disease". Advances in Nutrition. 2 (1): 1–7. doi:10.3945/an.110.000042. ISSN 2161-8313. PMC 3042791. PMID 22211184.

References

External links 
 Official website

Living people
American nutritionists
American health and wellness writers
American medical writers
American male non-fiction writers
Diet food advocates
Year of birth missing (living people)
American food scientists
Fellows of the American College of Nutrition
Ohio State University College of Food, Agricultural, and Environmental Sciences alumni